Victoria Lorna Perez Aluquin-Fernandez (born December 23, 1961), better known by her stage name Lorna Tolentino, sometimes known as L.T., an abbreviation of her screen name, is a Filipino actress, host and executive producer. Her career as an actress in film and television has spanned over five decades, beginning when she debuted as a child actress in the 1970 film Divina Gracia.

Tolentino has starred in over 80 films throughout her career, including Moral, Narito ang Puso Ko and Somewhere. She has won 6 FAMAS Awards (including 3 Best actress wins), 4 FAP Awards, a Gawad Urian Award and a Golden Screen Award.

Tolentino is the widow of actor Rudy Fernandez. Together they had two children, one, the actor Renz Fernandez. As a child star, she used the screen name, Giselle in the movie of the same title with Chiquito playing her adoptive father. As an adult actress, Seven Stars productions re-launched her in Miss Dulce Amor, Ina (popular novel in Liwayway Magazine) in 1978.

Life and career
She was born on December 23, 1961, in Concepcion, Tarlac and later moved to Manila. Her dad is from Liliw, Laguna. She is also the stepmother of actor Mark Anthony Fernandez. She is first cousin to actress Amy Perez, Zsa Zsa Padilla and a niece of actor Jerry Pons. She was married to actor Rudy Fernandez from 1983 till his death in 2008. They have two children.

She attended the elementary grades at St. Anthony School where she also finished high school. She took up a Bachelor of Arts course at St. Paul College in Quezon City, and also at the University of Santo Tomas and Maryknoll College (now Miriam College).

She started her career as a child actress. Later, she portrayed the young Susan Roces in Divina Gracia and has a total of at least 60 movies. She has won eight film awards and garnered 20 nominations (mostly for Best Actress in FAMAS).

Her notable performances were Uod at Rosas (1981), Moral (1982), Sinasamba Kita (1982), Init sa Magdamag (1983), Somewhere (1984), Huwag Mo Kaming Isumpa (1986), Nakagapos Na Puso (1986), Pinulot Ka Lang sa Lupa (1987), Natutulog Ba ang Diyos (1988). In 2002, Tolentino starred in her first Primetime Drama Kay Tagal Kang Hinintay the first time Tolentino starred in a teleserye. In 2004-2008 she went to GMA Network to star in Hanggang Kailan and host Startalk to replace Rosanna Roces.

Tolentino returned to ABS-CBN to star with an ensemble cast in Dahil May Isang Ikaw, which earned her more praise. In 2010, she starred in the TV drama Momay, and in 2011, she starred in Minsan Lang Kita Iibigin with an ensemble cast.

She is also one of the Grandslam actresses in Philippine Cinema together with Vilma Santos, Elizabeth Oropesa, Nora Aunor and Sharon Cuneta. She won her Grandslam Best Actress for Narito ang Puso Ko (1993). She went back to her original network, GMA Network, to star in the upcoming heavy drama series Pahiram ng Sandali.

In May 2001, Tolentino participated in the protests of EDSA III, which called for Joseph Estrada's return to the Philippine presidency.

Tolentino is also known for her dramatic roles in television dramas. In 2002-2003, she was cast in the suspense drama series Kay Tagal Kang Hinintay as Lorrea/Lorrinda Guinto/Red Butterfly, a lead role which successfully set Philippine Primetime TV Standards and a successful finale.

In 2009-2010, Tolentino stopped doing TV series and instead focused on full-length films. On occasions, she participated as a TV host. She came back to reclaim her throne when she played the role of Atty. Tessa Ramirez in the popular soap opera Dahil May Isang Ikaw which won her more accolades in the New York Television Awards for Best Telenovela.

In 2011, she starred in the action-drama television series Minsan Lang Kita Iibigin, where she played a villain as Alondra Sebastiano. She later left the network and starred in the television drama Glamorosa.

In 2012, Tolentino did the soap opera Pahiram ng Sandali with GMA-7 with actor Dingdong Dantes, Christopher de Leon and Max Collins. She was included in the cast of Valiente and the weekly series Third Eye both airing on TV 5.

In 2014, Tolentino had a small part in the GMA Network series, Genesis again with Dingdong Dantes.

In 2015, she starred with Ruffa Gutierrez and Gelli de Belen in Misterless Misis on TV 5.

In 2018, Tolentino came back to ABS-CBN after five years to do the daytime series Asintado.

Lorna Tolentino played the villainous and authoritarian bureaucrat-first lady turned warlord Lily Ann Cortez-Hidalgo on ABS-CBN's FPJ's Ang Probinsyano, topbilled by Coco Martin.

Filmography

Film

Television

As producer or executive producer
 Kaaway ng Batas (1990)
 Kislap sa Dilim (1991)
 Kamay ni Kain (1992)
 Kahit Buhay Ko (1992)
 Matimbang Pa sa Dugo (1995)
 Itataya Ko ang Buhay Ko (1996)
 Hula Mo, Huli Ko (2002)

Awards and nominations

Awards
 Grandslam Best Actress for Narito Ang Puso Ko (1993)
 FAMAS Best Actress for Katas ng Saudi (2008)
 FAMAS Best Actress for Abakada Ina (2002)
 FAMAS Best Actress for Narito Ang Puso Ko (1993)
 FAMAS Best Child Actress for Lumuha Pati Mga Anghel (1971)
 FAP Best Actress for Sa'yo Lamang (2010)
 FAP Best Actress for Abakada Ina (2002)
 FAP Best Actress for Narito Ang Puso Ko (1993)
 FAP Best Actress for Maging Aking Ka Lamang (1988)
 ENPRESS Golden Screen awards Best Actress for Comedy Katas ng Saudi (2008)
 Star Award Best Actress for Maging Akin Ka Lamang (1988)
 Gawad Urian Best Actress for Narito Ang Puso Ko (1993)
 Star Award - Best Actress for Narito Ang Puso Ko (1993)
 MFF Best Actress for Luksong Tinik (2000)
 Star Award For TV Best Actress (Drama) for Hanggang Kailan (2003)
 Star Award For TV Best Actress (Drama) for Kay Tagal Kang Hinintay (2004)
 Star Award For TV Best Actress (Single Performance) for Magpakailanman (2005)
 Star Award For TV Best Actress (Supporting Actress) for Asintado (2018)
 Pasado Award Bilang Pinakapasadong Aktres for the movie Sayo Lamang(2010)
 Luna Award Best Actress for the movie Sayo Lamang(2010)
 Golden Screen Award For TV Best Actress (Drama Series) for Minsan Lang Kita Iibigin(2011)
 Golden Dove Award For TV Best Actress (Drama) for Minsan Lang Kita Iibigin(2011)
 Female Star of the Night - ten times winner
 Miss RP Movies - five times winner
 ASIAN TV AWARD for Best Actress in a Lead Role (Highly Commended) for Pahiram ng Sandali (2012)

Nominations
 ASIAN Television Awards (nominated)
 Best Actress
 FAMAS
 Best Actress (10 nominations)
 Best Supporting Actress (1 nomination)
 Best Child Actress (1 nomination)
 Gawad Urian Awards
 Best Actress (9 nominations)
 FAP
 Best Actress (8 nominations)
 Golden Screen Awards
 Best Actress in a Leading Role (Drama) (2 nominations)
 Golden Screen TV Awards
 Best Actress in Drama Series (1 nomination)
 Star Award
 Best Actress (12 nominations)

References

External links
 

1961 births
Living people
ABS-CBN personalities
Actresses from Tarlac
Lorna
Filipino child actresses
Filipino women comedians
Filipino film actresses
Filipino people of Kapampangan descent
Filipino people of Spanish descent
Filipino Roman Catholics
Filipino television actresses
Former members of Iglesia ni Cristo
GMA Network personalities
Miriam College alumni
People from Manila
TV5 (Philippine TV network) personalities
University of Santo Tomas alumni
20th-century Filipino actresses
21st-century Filipino actresses